Yonggang Paeng clan was one of the Korean clans. Their Bon-gwan was in Ryonggang County, Nampo. According to the research in 2000, the number of Yonggang Paeng clan was 795. He was from Jiankang, China. He entered Goryeo as a fatherly master of Queen Noguk, an Imperial princess who had a marriage to an ordinary person. He was appointed as Grand Secretariat. Then, he became Prince of Yonggang. His descendant began Yonggang Paeng clan.

See also 
 Korean clan names of foreign origin

References

External links 
 

 
Korean clan names of Chinese origin